Jan Heřmánek (May 28, 1907 – May 13, 1978) was a Czechoslovak boxer who competed in the 1928 Summer Olympics.

In 1928 he won the silver medal in the middleweight class after losing the final against Piero Toscani.

He died in Prague.

1928 Olympic results
Below is the record of Jan Heřmánek, a Czech middleweight boxer who competed at the 1928 Amsterdam Olympics:

 Round of 32: bye
 Round of 16: defeated Georges Pixius (Luxembourg) on points
 Quarterfinal: defeated Harry Henderson (United States) on points
 Semifinal: defeated Fred Mallin (Great Britain) on points
 Final: lost to Piero Toscani (Italy) on points (was awarded silver medal)

References
 profile

1907 births
1978 deaths
Czechoslovak male boxers
Middleweight boxers
Olympic boxers of Czechoslovakia
Boxers at the 1928 Summer Olympics
Olympic silver medalists for Czechoslovakia
Olympic medalists in boxing
Medalists at the 1928 Summer Olympics